QSI International School of Zhuhai is an international school in Wanzi Subdistrict, Xiangzhou District, Zhuhai, Guangdong, China, serving ages 2–17. It was established in 1999 and is a part of Quality Schools International.

The Zhuhai Japanese Saturday School, a supplementary Japanese school, held classes at QSI Zhuhai, until 2012.

QSI Zhuhai was previously located in Building 2B, HengXin Industry District, Gongbei Subdistrict, Xiangzhou District. It was later located on the campus of Zhuhai Girls' Middle School in Xiangzhou District.

References

External links
 
 
 QSI International School of Zhuhai at Weebly

Buildings and structures in Zhuhai
1999 establishments in China
Educational institutions established in 1999
Primary schools in China
International schools in Guangdong
Zhuhai